Norman Morrison Isham (1864–1943) was a prominent architectural historian, author, and professor at Brown University and Rhode Island School of Design (RISD). He was an ardent preservationist and a pioneer in the study of early American architecture.

Biography
Norman M. Isham was born in Hartford, Connecticut on November 12, 1864, to Dr. Henry and Frances Elizabeth (Smyth) Isham. As a child his family moved to Providence, Rhode Island. Norman Isham attended Mowry and Goff's  preparatory school and Brown University. At Brown he received a A.B. in 1886 and an A.M. in Architecture in 1890. After graduation in 1886, Isham worked for architectural firm of Stone, Carpenter and Wilson and later Martin and Hall. He also served as an architecture instructor at Brown University.

In 1899 Isham and Benjamin Wright created an architecture partnership which existed from 1912 to 1920 and 1923 to 1933. Isham chaired the architectural department at the Rhode Island School of Design starting in 1912. He was a member of the American Institute of Architects and the Royal Institute of British Architects and published several architecture texts, including "Early Rhode Island Houses" in 1895. Isham was well known for his renovations of many prominent early Rhode Island and other New England houses, particularly, stone-enders.

After Isham's wife, Elizabeth Barbour Ormsbee, died in 1917, he moved from Providence to Wickford, Rhode Island. There, he constructed a two-story, shingle-style Colonial Revival home on Boston Neck Road. Initially, it was a summer home, but he moved there permanently after the death of his wife.

Isham was a consultant on the building of the American Wing of the Metropolitan Museum of Art in New York, and was a consulting architect on the Delaware Legislative Hall, 1930–1933.

Memberships and societies
 Member of the General Society of Colonial Wars
 Elected to the Walpole Society in 1911 
 Elected to the American Antiquarian Society in 1933

Historic preservation
Norman Isham is perhaps best known for his work preserving and restoring Colonial-era homes and structures in Rhode Island. He wrote extensively on the topic of Colonial architecture and furniture. His books Early Rhode Island Houses, published with Albert F. Brown in 1895, and Early Connecticut Houses, published in 1900, are classics in their field.

Some of the buildings Isham worked to preserve include:

 Bullock-Thomas House, North Kingstown, Rhode Island
Clemence-Irons House, Johnston, Rhode Island, 1691
Smith's Castle, Wickford, Rhode Island, 1678
Clement Weaver House, East Greenwich, Rhode Island, 1679
John Balch House, Beverly, Massachusetts, 1679
Eleazer Arnold House, Lincoln, Rhode Island, 1693
John Randall House, North Stonington, Connecticut, 1690
General Nathanael Greene Homestead, Coventry, Rhode Island, 1774
Gilbert Stuart birthplace, Saunderstown, Rhode Island, 1751
Hyland House, Guilford, Connecticut, 1713
 John Updike House, North Kingstown, Rhode Island
Newport Colony House, Newport, Rhode Island, 1739
Old City Hall, Newport, Rhode Island, 1762 
Newport Brick Market, Newport, Rhode Island, 1762
Stephen Hopkins House, Providence, Rhode Island, 1708
Redwood Library, Newport, Rhode Island, 1747
Trinity Church (Newport, Rhode Island), 1724
University Hall, Brown University
Wanton-Lyman-Hazard House, Newport, Rhode Island, 1697
Whitehall Museum House, Middletown, Rhode Island, 1729

Death and burial
Norman Isham died on January 1, 1943. His funeral attracted many renowned architects to Wickford to pay their respects. Tragically, fellow Providence architect Harry Slocomb suffered a heart attack and died after Isham's funeral service.

Isham is buried with his wife and parents at Elm Grove Cemetery in North Kingstown, Rhode Island. He left no descendants.

References

External links
Isham bio
Examples of Isham's work
Norman Isham Papers Collection at the RI Historical Society

1864 births
1943 deaths
Architects from Providence, Rhode Island
People from North Kingstown, Rhode Island
Writers from Hartford, Connecticut
Burials in Rhode Island
Brown University alumni
Rhode Island School of Design faculty
Writers from Providence, Rhode Island